Brian John Macpherson Partridge (born 21 January 1956) is a Scottish former first-class cricketer.

Partridge was born in January 1956 at Haddington. He later studied at St Edmund Hall at the University of Oxford, where he played first-class cricket for Oxford University on four occasions in 1977. Playing as a right-arm medium-fast bowler, he took 4 wickets with best figures of 2 for 38.

References

External links

1956 births
Living people
People from Haddington, East Lothian
Alumni of St Edmund Hall, Oxford
Scottish cricketers
Oxford University cricketers